Hugh Dacre, 4th Baron Dacre (1335–1383) was an English nobleman. He was born in 1335, the youngest son of Ralph Dacre, 1st Baron Dacre and his wife Margaret de Multon, 2nd Baroness Multon of Gilsland. His two older brothers preceded him in the barony, but both died childless. His brother William, the second baron, married but died childless in 1361. His brother Ralph, the third baron, was a clergyman who died unmarried and without issue in 1375. Hugh may have been implicated in his predecessor's death; he and Nicholas Harrington were excommunicated by the Archbishop of York, likely in connection with the murder, and they were both presented for the murder at Preston, though they escaped long-term repercussions.

Dacre, like many noblemen of his time, pursued a military career. He fought in the Hundred Years War in France and Flanders. Upon his return to England, he was one of the commissioners of the Western Marches.

Dacre married Ela (or Elizabeth) Maxwell, said to be the daughter of Alexander Maxwell, of the family that owned Caerlaverock Castle in Scotland. Their son, William succeeded to the barony upon Hugh's death in 1383.

References 

1335 births
1383 deaths
Hugh Dacre, 4th Baron Dacre
Familicides
4